MC Magika (born Birmingham), is a British MC, music producer and rave promoter. He was regularly featured at many of the big UK raves in the mid to late 1990s including Dreamscape, Helter Skelter, Fantazia, and on the dance music compilation Dancemania Speed sub-series. He is also well known for being the former MC for DJ Carl Cox.

Discography

Singles
Flashdance (What a Feeling) (1996)
Hardhouse Raver (2002) - with Mutant DJ

Albums
The Old Skool Masters Round 2: Ratpack V Magika Presenting Blackmagic (1998) - with Ratpack
Candy Raveparty Vol. 1 (2001) - with DJ Horn
Candy Raveparty Vol. 2 (2002) - with KengKeng

Appearances

Dreamscape
6 (1993)
7 (1993)
8 (1994)
10(1994)
11 (1994)
12 (1994)
14 (1994)
22 (1996)
24 (1997)

Dancemania
Speed : 3 (1999), 6 (2001), 7 (2001), 8 (2002), 9 (2002), 10 (2002)
Classical Speed : 1 (2002)
Speed G : 1 (2003)
Best of Hardcore (2003)

Others
Happy Daze (1996)
Dance Dance Revolution 3rdMIX Original Soundtrack (2000)
Hardcore Underground (2006)
X Years of Hellhouse (2009)
In Full Effect - The Mix Tapes (1995)
The Payback (1996)
Capital Punishment (1997)
Helter Skelter Imagination NYE 1996/1997 (1997)
Black Magik (1998)
Helter Skelter 10 Legendary Years Hardcore (2001)
Banginglobe Anthem (2002)
Dance Valley 2002 - Hard Dance Edition (2002)
The Sound of Don Diablo (2002)
Torture Garden vs. Fallen Angel (2002)
Hard Kandy - International Series Vol 1 (2004)
The Legend of Hellhouse #02 (2004)
X Bass (2004)
Black Magic - Hard Trance Anthems (2005)
Blutonium Presents Hardstyle Vol. 5 (2005)
Hardbass Generation (2005)
Hardcore Underground (2006)
Pharmacy Volume 3: Down with the Sickness (2006)
X Years of Hellhouse (2009)

References

English record producers
People from Birmingham, West Midlands
Living people
Year of birth missing (living people)